The 2011 season for  began in January with the Tour de San Luis and ended in October at the Japan Cup. As a UCI ProTeam, they were automatically invited and obligated to send a squad to every event in the UCI World Tour.

The team had 30 victories in 2011, second-most among top teams behind only . The team's most prolific winners were Peter Sagan and Elia Viviani, who accounted for 22 of them. The team failed to relive their great successes of 2010 in the Grand Tours – Ivan Basso, though the reigning Giro d'Italia champion, declined to defend that crown and focused instead on the Tour de France. Vincenzo Nibali was instead the leader for the Giro, and again for the Vuelta a España, where he did return to defend his championship. The team took two stage wins each in the Giro and Vuelta, but did not mount a serious threat for the overall crown in any of the three. Elsewhere, the team's principal successes were in single-day races, especially those in their home country Italy, winning seven such races.

Team roster 
Ages as of January 1, 2011.

Riders who joined the team for the 2011 season

Riders who left the team during or after the 2010 season

One-day races
Before the spring season and the races known as classics, Viviani won the first single-day race of the season held in Italy, the Gran Premio della Costa Etruschi. The finish was a field sprint, and Viviani came in first after a leadout from Peter Sagan, who held on for fourth. The race was noteworthy as well for the absence of six-time reigning champion Alessandro Petacchi from the team's Italian rivals . Viviani also won the first Tour de Mumbai race, and nearly won the second, finishing just centimeters behind 's Robert Hunter.

Spring classics
Basso won the Gran Premio di Lugano in late February. After Caruso launched an attack that effectively softened the field, Basso's winning move came as his teammate was caught. He drew 's Fabio Duarte with him, and defeated him in the sprint 16 seconds ahead of the front of the remaining field. The team came to the first monument race of the season, Milan–San Remo, without a real field sprinter, despite that race's tendency to end in a sprint. When a crash occurred on the Le Manie climb  from the finish line, effectively splitting the race into two groups, Nibali and  captain Alessandro Ballan struck a deal wherein both squads would send men to the front of the leading group. This was both to keep the group out ahead of the second so that sprinters left behind like Óscar Freire, Mark Cavendish, and Tyler Farrar would not be able to contest the win, but also to potentially get rid of the few sprinters that had made the split, namely Tom Boonen, Alessandro Petacchi, and Heinrich Haussler. Nibali tried to attack for victory on the Poggio, knowing that even among the small group that was left he was not likely to have the best finishing sprint. Seven riders followed his acceleration, and all seven eventually passed him, leaving Nibali eighth on the day. After Peter Sagan had showed strong form at Gent–Wevelgem, the squad was touted as fielding contenders at the second monument race, the Tour of Flanders. The squad failed to be at all competitive, however; only Koren and Oss finished the race, with six others, including Sagan, abandoning before the conclusion. Their best-placed rider being 95th was criticized as a major disappointment. Nibali rode Liège–Bastogne–Liège as his final tune-up prior to the Giro d'Italia. While race winner Philippe Gilbert and the Schleck brothers, who rounded out the podium with the Belgian, slipped away on the Côte de Roche aux Faucons and were not caught, Nibali instigated the chase group that formed on the Côte de Saint-Nicolas. He finished eighth. Afterward, he said he was satisfied with his performance, since he had not gone into the red to follow Gilbert and the Schlecks and put in a good ride on the last climb. He was, however, spent from his effort on the Côte de Saint-Nicolas and could not sprint for fourth place.

The team also sent squads to the Montepaschi Strade Bianche, the GP Miguel Indurain, Paris–Roubaix, the Amstel Gold Race, La Flèche Wallonne and the Giro di Toscana, but placed no higher than 11th in any of these races.

Fall races
The team also sent squads to the Clásica de San Sebastián, Tre Valli Varesine, Trofeo Melinda, GP Ouest-France, the Grand Prix Cycliste de Montréal, the Memorial Marco Pantani, the Gran Premio Bruno Beghelli and the Amstel Curaçao Race, but placed no higher than 11th in any of these races.

Stage races
The team won two minor classifications at the Giro della Provincia di Reggio Calabria in January, Oss the youth classification and the squad the teams classification. In February, Peter Sagan was dominant at the Giro di Sardegna, winning three stages with three different sorts of rides. He took stage 1 from a 25-strong group sprint after a proper leadout by Capecchi and Oss, finishing a full bike length ahead of Alessandro Ballan in second. While he lost his race lead after stage 2 when he finished two seconds behind an attacking Damiano Cunego and José Serpa, Sagan reclaimed it with a similar move in stage 3. With an uphill sprint finish shaping up, Sagan attacked and drew Cunego and Serpa with him, the three of them finishing two seconds clear of the best of the scattered groups that finished behind them. The fourth stage was flat and seemed suited for a full field sprint, but Sagan slipped away in the final kilometer to finish a second ahead of the fast-charging sprinters at the head of the peloton, for his third win. He ceded a little time back to Cunego and Serpa in the hilly stage 5, but still won the race overall by three seconds over Serpa and seven over Cunego; also winning the points classification in the process. While Basso had hoped for overall success at Tirreno–Adriatico, he failed to be a major factor at any point, and finished fourth overall. Nibali was fifth, and the squad won the teams classification. Guarnieri won the early afternoon short road race on the last day of the Three Days of De Panne. Sagan took a stage win at the Tour of California for the second year in a row. The young Slovakian was best of a 45-rider group that finished together at the head of the four-climb stage. He also won the sprints classification for the second year in a row, thanks to high placings on other stages in addition to his win. On the whole, however, his climbing legs were not as good as they had been in 2010, since he finished the race in 35th place over 20 minutes down in the overall. He was also just fourth-best in the youth classification.

The team also won lesser classifications at the Tour de Suisse, the Tour of Slovenia, the Tour de Pologne, the USA Pro Cycling Challenge, and the Giro di Padania. The team also sent squads to the Tour Down Under, the Tour de San Luis, Paris–Nice, the Settimana internazionale di Coppi e Bartali, Volta a Catalunya, the Tour of the Basque Country, the Giro del Trentino, the Tour of Turkey, the Tour de Romandie, the Tour de Luxembourg, the Critérium du Dauphiné, the Eneco Tour and the Tour of Utah, but did not achieve a stage win, classification win, or podium finish in any of them.

Grand Tours

Giro d'Italia
Reigning Giro champion Basso will not defend his title, preferring to focus on the Tour de France. He had for a time considered riding the Giro in a supporting role to Nibali, who will ride as the squad's captain. Team management decided that in the interests of respecting the race, they would not have Basso ride but be unable (due to saving himself for the Tour) to give full effort in the Giro's most difficult stages.

Tour de France

Vuelta a España

Season victories

Footnotes

References

2011 road cycling season by team
Liquigas
2011 in Italian sport